The Journal of Biophotonics is a monthly peer-reviewed scientific journal covering research on the interactions between light and biological material. It was established in 2008 by Jürgen Popp (Friedrich Schiller University Jena), Gert von Bally (Muenster, Germany), and Andreas Thoss (Berlin, Germany). The journal is published by Wiley-VCH and the editor-in-chief is Jürgen Popp.

In addition to regular submissions, the journal publishes topical issues on selected research areas, e.g. biophotonics in regenerative medicine and dermatology, optical coherence tomography, and therapeutic laser applications.

Abstracting and indexing
The journal is abstracted and indexed in:
BIOSIS Previews
Current Contents
Inspec
MEDLINE/PubMed
Science Citation Index Expanded
Chemical Abstracts Service
Scopus
According to the Journal Citation Reports, the journal has a 2020 impact factor of 3.207.

References

External links

Publications established in 2008
Biology journals
Monthly journals
Wiley-VCH academic journals
English-language journals